Topi Drama is a Pakistani rock band, formed in 2010, based in Lahore, Punjab.

History 
The band was formed in 2010 with the three members, band's lead vocalist Sohail Qureshi, Arafat Mazhar and Kenny Zeerick are also members of the band.

Band released their first song "Inquilab" in January 2013, song is about the revolution which people dream of. "Khoon" is the band's latest song released in February 2013. Khoon is about the blood all around in Pakistan specially for Shia community.

Discography 
 "Inquilab" (single) - 2013
 "Khoon" (single) - 2013

Members 
 Sohail Qureshi - lead vocalist
 Arafat Mazhar - guitarist
 Kenny Zeerick - drummer

See also 
 List of Pakistani music bands

References

External links 
 

Musical groups established in 2010
Pakistani musical trios
Musical groups from Lahore
Pakistani rock music groups
2010 establishments in Pakistan